The colback, or busby, is a fur headpiece of Turkish origin. It was worn by officers and elite companies of hussars and chasseurs in the French army during the French Directory and the First French Empire, under Napoleon I. It often had a plume in front.

See also 
 Busby (military headdress)
 Kalpak
 List of headgear

References

External links 

Turkish clothing